was a village located in Tagata District, Shizuoka, Japan on the Suruga Bay coast of Izu Peninsula. Views of Mount Fuji can be seen from the village, which is a tourist resort.

As of March 1, 2005, the village had an estimated population of 3,681 and a density of 105.4 persons per km2. The total area was 34.92 km2.

On April 1, 2005, Heda was merged into the expanded city of Numazu.

On December 23, 1854, Diana, the flagship of the Russian fleet bearing Admiral Yevfimy Putyatin and his delegation for the negotiation of the Treaty of Shimoda was struck by a tsunami from the Ansei Tōkai earthquake and sank. The survivors stayed in Heda, where they cooperated with Japanese carpenters and shipbuilders to construct a new vessel (christened Heda) to take them back to Russia. This marked the first cooperative venture between Japanese and Europeans since the start of the national seclusion policy at the start of the Edo period.

In the April 1, 1889 cadastral reform of Meiji period Japan, Heda was organized as Heda Village.

Heda is known for the Japanese spider crab called takaashi-gani in Japanese which can grow up to 4 metres in length. Smaller versions of takaashi-gani (about 1 metre) are available in several restaurants and hotels around the village.

Gallery

Dissolved municipalities of Shizuoka Prefecture
Numazu, Shizuoka